The Big Red Machine is a nickname for the Cincinnati Reds baseball team that dominated the National League from 1970 to 1979 and is widely recognized as being among the best in baseball history. The team won six National League West Division titles, four National League pennants, and two World Series titles. Between 1970 and 1979 the team averaged over 95 wins a season, with a total record of 953 wins and 657 losses.

The core of that Reds team had the best record in the Major Leagues in 1981, but did not make the postseason because of Bowie Kuhn's split-season playoff format due to the player's strike.

Origins

The nickname was introduced in a July 4, 1969 article by Bob Hertzel in The Cincinnati Enquirer, but gained prominence in reference to the 1970 team, which won 70 of its first 100 games (a feat accomplished only a few times in MLB history) and posted a regular season record of 102–60 and won the National League pennant. Rookie and future-Hall of Fame manager Sparky Anderson headed the Big Red Machine, which at its peak featured Pete Rose, Johnny Bench, Joe Morgan and Tony Pérez, and was supported by Dave Concepción, George Foster, César Gerónimo and Ken Griffey, Sr. The Cincinnati Reds of the 1970s garnered more World Series appearances than any other team during that decade, and compiled an overall record of 953 wins and 657 losses. They are the only National League team since the 1921 and 1922 New York Giants to win back-to-back World Championships. Among NL teams, only the 1996 Atlanta Braves and the 2009 Philadelphia Phillies have returned to the Fall Classic with a chance to repeat as World Champions in years since, both falling to the New York Yankees of the "Core Four" era. The 2010–2014 San Francisco Giants did win three World Championships in five years, at least sparking the debate of whether they could be considered a National League dynasty, but they did not reach the postseason in consecutive years during this span.

The "Great Eight" 
The eight players most frequently referenced as members of the Big Red Machine include baseball's all-time hit leader in Rose; three Hall of Fame players in Bench, Pérez and Morgan, six National League MVP selections, four National League home run season leaders, and three NL Batting Champions.  Between them, these eight players collectively won 25 Gold Glove awards and made 63 All-Star Game appearances. The starting lineup of Bench, Rose, Morgan, Pérez, Concepción, Foster, Griffey, and Gerónimo (collectively referred to as the "Great Eight") played 88 games together during the 1975 and 1976 seasons, losing only 19.

Later Years
Dan Driessen took over at first base for Tony Perez in 1977. Although some of the original players departed the team, some extended the Big Red Machine nickname for two more years until the departures of Anderson and Rose following the 1978 season. The Reds turned around to finish in second place in 1977 and 1978. Ray Knight replaced Pete Rose at third base for Cincinnati in 1979 and the rest of the Reds starting lineup still included six of the great eight: Bench, Morgan, Foster, Concepcion, Griffey and Geronimo. The Cincinnati Reds won another division title in 1979, but lost to the Pittsburgh Pirates in the NLCS.

The Big Red Machine had one last great run in 1981 when they finished the strike season with the best record in baseball. Only three of the great eight remained in the starting lineup: Foster, Griffey and Concepcion. Bench had an injury plagued season and was moved from catcher to third base. Tom Seaver had a win–loss record of 14–2 and an ERA of 2.54 while starting only 23 games in the Reds' strike-shortened 108-game regular season. Despite that, the Reds finished second in the National League West in both halves of the season, making them ineligible to compete in the postseason despite having the best overall record in baseball.

Rivalries
The Big Red Machine's archrival were the Los Angeles Dodgers. The two teams often competed for the NL West division title and finished either first or second in every year from 1970 through 1979 with the one exception being 1971. Reds manager Sparky Anderson once said, "I don't think there's a rivalry like ours in either league. The Giants are supposed to be the Dodgers' natural rivals, but I don't think the feeling is there anymore. It's not there the way it is with us and the Dodgers." The rivalry ended when division realignment moved the Reds to the NL Central. However, they did face one another in the 1995 NLDS, with the Reds sweeping the Dodgers in three games.

The Big Red Machine was also part of the rivalry with the two Pennsylvania teams. All of the Reds' four pennants in the 1970s came against these teams (Pittsburgh Pirates in 1970, 1972, and 1975, and Philadelphia Phillies in 1976).

Statistics

Sons of the Big Red Machine
The clubhouse of the Big Red Machine was full of young kids who would go on to play in the Major Leagues. The most successful was Ken Griffey Sr.'s son Ken Griffey Jr., who went on to have a Hall of Fame career. Furthermore, Ed Sprague Sr.'s son Ed Sprague Jr., Charlie Leibrandt's son Brandon Leibrandt, Pedro Borbon's son Pedro Borbón Jr., Ed Crosby's son Bobby Crosby, Pete Rose's son Pete Rose Jr., Clyde Mashore's sons Damon Mashore and Justin Mashore, Hal McRae's son Brian McRae, Julian Javier's son Stan Javier, and Tony Perez's son Eduardo Perez as well as Bill Plummer's grandson Conner Menez, and Lee May's grandson Jacob May, all played in MLB. Additionally, Paul Blair's son Paul Blair III, Bobby Tolan's son Robbie Tolan, Lee May's son Lee May Jr.,  Tommy Helms' son Tommy Helms Jr., Rich Hinton's son Robert Hinton, Darrel Chaney's son Keith Chaney and grandson Chase Chaney, Andy Kosco's son Bryn Kosco, Ken Griffey Sr.'s son Craig Griffey, and Tony Perez's son Victor Perez, all played minor league baseball.

Further reading

References

Cincinnati Reds
Cincinnati Reds postseason
Nicknamed groups of baseball players